All Aboard is a 1917 American short comedy film starring  Harold Lloyd.

Plot
A father takes his daughter on a trip to Bermuda in an attempt to separate her from a suitor.  Little does anyone know that the suitor has stowed away on board.  When he is discovered, he is credited with catching a crook.  The hapless hero receives a reward, and also the girl.

Cast
 Harold Lloyd as The Boy
 Snub Pollard as Passenger with Trunk
 Bebe Daniels as The Girl
 Gus Leonard as The Girl's Father
 Charles Stevenson (as C.E. Stevens) - The Baggage Agent
 Sammy Brooks as Midget Crew Member 
 W.L. Adams
 Virginia Baynes
 William Blaisdell
 Clara Dray
 Loretta Dray
 Billy Fay (credited as William Fay)
 Mabel Gibson
 Oscar Larson
 Chris Lynton
 M.J. McCarthy
 Susan Miller
 Belle Mitchell
 Marie Mosquini
 Fred C. Newmeyer (credited as Fred Newmeyer)
 Hazel Powell
 Nina Speight
 William Strohbach (credited as William Strawback)
 Lillian Sylvester
 Dorothea Wolbert (credited as Dorothy Wolbert)

Reception
Like many American films of the time, All Aboard was subject to cuts by city and state film censorship boards. For example, the Chicago Board of Censors required the cut of the scene with the woman rolling on the man and of the woman in hallway with her nightgown raised, exposing her legs.

See also
 Harold Lloyd filmography

References

External links

 All Aboard on YouTube

1917 films
1917 short films
1917 comedy films
Silent American comedy films
American silent short films
American black-and-white films
Films directed by Alfred J. Goulding
Articles containing video clips
American comedy short films
Surviving American silent films
1910s American films
1910s English-language films